= Dock Creek (West Virginia) =

Stream in West Virginia, U.S.

Coordinates: 38°20′07″N 82°35′05″W

Dock Creek is a stream in the U.S. state of West Virginia.

Dock Creek was named in honor of Doctor Hampton, a pioneer settler.

== See also ==
- List of rivers of West Virginia
